Sunny Hills High School (SHHS) is a public high school located in Fullerton, California, United States. Established in 1959, it is part of the Fullerton Joint Union High School District.

SHHS has been an International Baccalaureate World School since 1987, and hosts the largest IB program in California. It has been recognized four times as a California Distinguished School, in 1988, 1994, 2009, and 2019, and recognized as one of the top high schools in the United States in the March 30, 1998, March 13, 2000, and June 2003 issues of Newsweek magazine. At 284 in the magazine's latest (2007) rankings of public high schools, Sunny Hills remains in the top 0.1 percent of schools in the country. Sunny Hills was presented with the National Blue Ribbon School Award in 2012.

The school contains the Sunny Hills Performing Arts Center, a notable venue in Orange County for classical performances.

Notable alumni

Paul Abbott, former MLB player
Kathryn Bigelow, Academy Award-winning film director (Zero Dark Thirty, The Hurt Locker, Point Break, Near Dark)
Shane Black, screenwriter and director
Jackson Browne, folk singer and Rock & Roll Hall of Famer
Gary Carter, MLB player and Baseball Hall of Famer and World Champion with the New York Mets 
Kelly Fremon Craig, film director and screenwriter, The Edge of SeventeenLeanna, Monica, and Joy Creel, identical triplet actresses, Parent Trap IIITarek El Moussa, TV personality
 David Farkas, actor and musician
Mike Fleiss, executive producer of The Bachelor, Poseidon and The Texas Chainsaw MassacreJim Karsatos, Ohio State quarterback, Cotton Bowl Champion
Brian Kelley, former NFL 11-year veteran inside linebacker for the New York Giants
Justin Lee, actor on Arrested Development and Shredderman RulesLarry MacDuff, NFL defensive coordinator and special teams coordinator for various NFL teams
Camille Mana, film actress
Eric Mun, actor, singer and rapper of Korean band Shinhwa
Austin St. John, the Red Ranger in Mighty Morphin Power Rangers and Gold Ranger in Power Rangers: ZeoMassy Tadjedin, screenwriter of The JacketMartha Nix Wade, actress, Days of Our Lives and The WaltonsDavid S. Ward, screenwriter and director (The Sting, King Ralph, Major League, Sleepless in Seattle)
Robert Weide, Emmy, Golden Globe-winning and Oscar-nominated filmmaker
Brad Williams, comedian and actor, regularly appears on Mind of Mencia''
Steve Yoo, Korean singer (Yoo Seung Joon)

References

External links

 

Education in Fullerton, California
Educational institutions established in 1959
High schools in Orange County, California
International Baccalaureate schools in California
Public high schools in California
1959 establishments in California